The Episcopal Theological Seminary of the Caribbean (ESTC) was a seminary of the American Episcopal Church in San Juan, Puerto Rico. It was founded in 1961 and dedicated by Presiding Bishop Arthur C. Lichtenberger. It closed in 1976.

Notable faculty 
Louis Weil

Notable alumni
Francisco Reus-Froylan
James Ottley
Victor Scantlebury

External links
An Episcopal Dictionary of the Church
Fr. Vilar Named Acting Rector of Caribbean Seminary
Joint Graduation Ceremonies Held in Puerto Rico

Episcopal Church (United States)
Anglican seminaries and theological colleges
Educational institutions established in 1961
Educational institutions disestablished in 1976